Three Assembly elections took place in 2003:

India 
State Assembly elections in India, 2003

Northern Ireland 
2003 Northern Ireland Assembly election

Wales 
2003 National Assembly for Wales election

See also 
List of elections in 2003